Kathryn Linda Haycock Proffitt (born 1951) was an American non-career appointee who served as the ambassador extraordinary and plenipotentiary to Malta from 1998 until 2001.

Prior to her appointment, Proffitt had been president, executive officer and founder of Call-America, a telecommunications company. She was also vice chairman of the Competitive Telecommunications Association (CompTel) and director of ICG Communications, Inc.

Before that, Proffitt was a registered dental hygienist in Toppenish, Washington, and was the acting director of Dental Hygiene at Yakima Valley College. She attended Portland State University and graduated in 1972 from the University of Oregon Dental School. In 1973, she completed postgraduate training in restorative dentistry at the University of Washington School of Dentistry.

References

Living people
1951 births
Ambassadors of the United States to Malta
American women ambassadors
20th-century American diplomats
21st-century American diplomats
American women chief executives
American company founders
American women company founders
Portland State University alumni
University of Oregon alumni
University of Washington alumni
20th-century American women
21st-century American women